Equord may refer to:

 , a village in the municipality of Hohenhameln, Lower Saxony, Germany
 Kurt von Hammerstein-Equord (1878–1943), German general